Arabic numerals are the ten symbols most commonly used to write decimal numbers: , , , , , , , ,  and . They are also used for writing numbers in other systems such as octal, and for writing identifiers such as computer symbols, trademarks, or license plates. The term often implies a decimal number, in particular when contrasted with Roman numerals.

They are also called Western Arabic numerals, Ghubār numerals, Hindu-Arabic numerals, Western digits, Latin digits, or European digits. The Oxford English Dictionary differentiates them with the fully capitalized Arabic Numerals to refer to the Eastern digits. The term numbers or numerals or digits often implies only these symbols, however this can only be inferred from context.

Europeans learned of Arabic numerals about the 10th century, though their spread was a gradual process. Two centuries later, in the Algerian city of Béjaïa, the Italian scholar Fibonacci first encountered the numerals; his work was crucial in making them known throughout Europe. European trade, books, and colonialism helped popularize the adoption of Arabic numerals around the world. The numerals have found worldwide use significantly beyond the contemporary spread of the Latin alphabet, and have become common in the writing systems where other numeral systems existed previously, such as Chinese and Japanese numerals.

History

Origin 

The reason the digits are more commonly known as "Arabic numerals" in Europe and the Americas is that they were introduced to Europe in the 10th century by Arabic speakers of Spain and North Africa, who were then using the digits from Libya to Morocco. In the eastern part of Arabic Peninsula, Arabs were using the Eastern Arabic numerals or "Mashriki" numerals: ٠ ١ ٢ ٣ ٤ ٥ ٦ ٧ ٨ ٩

Al-Nasawi wrote in the early 11th century that mathematicians had not agreed on the form of the numerals, but most of them had agreed to train themselves with the forms now known as Eastern Arabic numerals. The oldest specimens of the written numerals available are from Egypt and date to 873–874 CE. They show three forms of the numeral "2" and two forms of the numeral "3", and these variations indicate the divergence between what later became known as the Eastern Arabic numerals and the Western Arabic numerals. The Western Arabic numerals came to be used in the Maghreb and Al-Andalus from the 10th century onward. Some amount of consistency in the Western Arabic numeral forms endured from the 10th century, found in a Latin manuscript of Isidore of Seville's Etymologiae from 976 and the Gerbertian abacus, into the 12th and 13th centuries, in early manuscripts of translations from the city of Toledo.

Calculations were originally performed using a dust board (takht, Latin: tabula), which involved writing symbols with a stylus and erasing them. The use of the dust board appears to have introduced a divergence in terminology as well: whereas the Hindu reckoning was called ḥisāb al-hindī in the east, it was called ḥisāb al-ghubār in the west (literally, "calculation with dust"). The numerals themselves were referred to in the west as ashkāl al‐ghubār ("dust figures") or qalam al-ghubår ("dust letters"). Al-Uqlidisi later invented a system of calculations with ink and paper "without board and erasing" (bi-ghayr takht wa-lā maḥw bal bi-dawāt wa-qirṭās).

A popular myth claims that the symbols were designed to indicate their numeric value through the number of angles they contained, but no evidence exists of this, and the myth is difficult to reconcile with any digits past 4.

Adoption and spread 

The first mentions of the numerals from 1 to 9 in the West are found in the Codex Vigilanus of 976, an illuminated collection of various historical documents covering a period from antiquity to the 10th century in Hispania. Other texts show that numbers from 1 to 9 were occasionally supplemented by a placeholder known as sipos, represented as a circle or wheel, reminiscent of the eventual symbol for zero. The Arabic term for zero is sifr, transliterated into Latin as cifra, and the origin of the English word cipher.

From the 980s, Gerbert of Aurillac (later, Pope Sylvester II) used his position to spread knowledge of the numerals in Europe. Gerbert studied in Barcelona in his youth. He was known to have requested mathematical treatises concerning the astrolabe from Lupitus of Barcelona after he had returned to France.

The reception of Arabic numerals in the West was gradual and lukewarm, as other numeral systems circulated in addition to the older Roman numbers. As a discipline, the first to adopt Arabic numerals as part of their own writings were astronomers and astrologists, evidenced from manuscripts surviving from mid-12th-century Bavaria. Reinher of Paderborn (1140–1190) used the numerals in his calendrical tables to calculate the dates of Easter more easily in his text Compotus emendatus.

Italy 

Fibonacci, a mathematician from the Republic of Pisa who had studied in Béjaïa (Bugia), Algeria, promoted the Hindu-Arabic numeral system in Europe with his 1202 book Liber Abaci:

When my father, who had been appointed by his country as public notary in the customs at Bugia acting for the Pisan merchants going there, was in charge, he summoned me to him while I was still a child, and having an eye to usefulness and future convenience, desired me to stay there and receive instruction in the school of accounting. There, when I had been introduced to the art of the Indians' nine symbols through remarkable teaching, knowledge of the art very soon pleased me above all else and I came to understand it.

The Liber Abaci introduced the huge advantages of a positional numeric system, and was widely influential. As Fibonacci used the symbols from Béjaïa for the digits, these symbols were also introduced in the same instruction, ultimately leading to their widespread adoption.

Fibonacci's introduction coincided with Europe's commercial revolution of the 12th and 13th centuries, centered in Italy. Positional notation could be used for quicker and more complex mathematical operations (such as currency conversion) than Roman and other numeric systems could. They could also handle larger numbers, did not require a separate reckoning tool, and allowed the user to check a calculation without repeating the entire procedure. Although positional notation opened possibilities that were hampered by previous systems, late medieval Italian merchants did not stop using Roman numerals (or other reckoning tools). Rather, Arabic numerals became an additional tool that could be used alongside others.

Europe 

In the late 14th century only a few texts using Arabic numerals appeared outside of Italy. This suggests that the use of Arabic numerals in commercial practice, and the significant advantage they conferred, remained a virtual Italian monopoly until the late 15th century. This may in part have been due to language – although Fibonacci's Liber Abaci was written in Latin, the Italian abacus traditions was predominantly written in Italian vernaculars that circulated in the private collections of abacus schools or individuals. It was likely difficult for non-Italian merchant bankers to access comprehensive information.

The European acceptance of the numerals was accelerated by the invention of the printing press, and they became widely known during the 15th century. Their use grew steadily in other centers of finance and trade such as Lyon. Early evidence of their use in Britain includes: an equal hour horary quadrant from 1396, in England, a 1445 inscription on the tower of Heathfield Church, Sussex; a 1448 inscription on a wooden lych-gate of Bray Church, Berkshire; and a 1487 inscription on the belfry door at Piddletrenthide church, Dorset; and in Scotland a 1470 inscription on the tomb of the first Earl of Huntly in Elgin Cathedral. In central Europe, the King of Hungary Ladislaus the Posthumous, started the use of Arabic numerals, which appear for the first time in a royal document of 1456.

By the mid-16th century, they were in common use in most of Europe. Roman numerals remained in use mostly for the notation of Anno Domini (“A.D.”) years, and for numbers on clock faces. Other digits (such as Eastern Arabic) were virtually unknown.

Russia 
Prior to the introduction of Arabic numerals, Cyrillic numerals, derived from the Cyrillic alphabet, were used by South and East Slavic peoples. The system was used in Russia as late as the early 18th century, although it was formally replaced in official use by Peter the Great in 1699. Reasons for Peter's switch from the alphanumerical system are believed to go beyond his desire to imitate the West. Historian Peter Brown makes arguments for sociological, militaristic, and pedagogical reasons for the change. At a broad, societal level, Russian merchants, soldiers, and officials increasingly came into contact with counterparts from the West and became familiar with the communal use of Arabic numerals. Peter the Great also travelled incognito throughout Northern Europe from 1697 to 1698 during his Grand Embassy and was likely exposed to Western mathematics, if informally, during this time. The Cyrillic numeric system was also inferior in terms of calculating properties of objects in motions, such as the trajectories and parabolic flight patterns of artillery. It was unable to keep pace with Arabic numerals in the growing science of ballistics, whereas Western mathematicians such as John Napier had been publishing on the topic since 1614.

China 

Chinese numeral systems that used positional notation (such as the counting rod system and Suzhou numerals) were in use in China prior to the introduction of Arabic numerals, and some were introduced to medieval China by the Muslim Hui people. In the early 17th century, European-style Arabic numerals were introduced by Spanish and Portuguese Jesuits.

Encoding
The ten Arabic numerals are encoded in virtually every character set designed for electric, radio, and digital communication, such as Morse code.

They are encoded in ASCII at positions 0x30 to 0x39. Masking to the lower four binary bits (or taking the last hexadecimal digit) gives the value of the digit, a great help in converting text to numbers on early computers. These positions were inherited in Unicode. EBCDIC used different values, but also had the lower 4 bits equal to the digit value.

Comparison with other digits

See also
 Arabic numeral variations
 Regional variations in modern handwritten Arabic numerals
 Seven-segment display
 Text figures

Explanatory notes

Citations

General and cited sources

Further reading

External links

 Lam Lay Yong, "Development of Hindu Arabic and Traditional Chinese Arithmetic", Chinese Science 13 (1996): 35–54. 
 "Counting Systems and Numerals", Historyworld. Retrieved 11 December 2005.
 The Evolution of Numbers. 16 April 2005.
 O'Connor, J. J., and E. F. Robertson, Indian numerals . November 2000.
 History of the numerals
 Arabic numerals
 Hindu-Arabic numerals
 Numeral & Numbers' history and curiosities
 Gerbert d'Aurillac's early use of Hindu-Arabic numerals at Convergence

Numerals